() or Admiral of the Fleet is the most senior naval officer rank of the Royal Thai Navy. Today it is only ceremonially held by members of the Thai Royal family. The Royal Thai Army equivalent is known as just Chom Phon and Chom Phon Akat for the Royal Thai Air Force.

The King of Thailand as Head of the Royal Thai Armed Forces is automatically made a Chom Phon upon accession. The rank was formally created in 1888, together with all other ranks of the military by King Chulalongkorn (Rama V), who wanted to modernize his Armed Forces through western lines.

Supreme Head of the Navy

List of admirals of the fleet

Rank flags

See also

Military ranks of the Thai armed forces
Field marshal (Thailand) (Chom Phon): equivalent rank in the Royal Thai Army
Marshal of the Royal Thai Air Force (Chom Phon Akat): equivalent rank in the Royal Thai Air Force
Admiral of the fleet
List of fleet and grand admirals
Head of the Royal Thai Armed Forces

References

Thailand
Thailand
Thai admirals
Royal Thai Navy personnel